The Ashton to Tetonia Trail is a  trail from Ashton, Idaho to Tetonia, Idaho

The trail has a long and high trestle bridge crossing over Conant Creek, on a former railroad bridge built in 1911, which is listed on the National Register of Historic Places.  The bridge is the Conant Creek Pegram Truss Railroad Bridge.

References

Rail trails in Idaho